{{Speciesbox
| image = Prunus maritima.jpg
| display_parents = 2
| status = DD
| status_system = IUCN3.1
| genus = Prunus
| parent = Prunus sect. Prunocerasus
| species = maritima
| authority = Marshall
| synonyms =
Prunus acuminata Hook.f.
Prunus acuminata Michx.Prunus gravesii Small Prunus maritima var. gravesii (Small) G.J.Anderson Prunus declinata Marsh.Prunus lancifolia Clav.Prunus littoralis Bigel.Prunus poiretiana Heynh.Prunus pubescens PurshPrunus pygmaea Willd.Prunus reclinata Bosc ex SpachPrunus sphaerica Willd.
| synonyms_ref = 
}}Prunus maritima, the beach plum, is a species of plum native to the East Coast of the United States. It is a choice wild edible and its few pests and salt tolerance make it a resilient fruit crop for degraded lands and urban soils.

They are green on top and pale below, becoming showy red or orange in the autumn. The fruit is an edible drupe  in diameter in the wild plant, red, yellow, blue, or nearly black.Huxley, A., ed. (1992). New RHS Dictionary of Gardening. Macmillan .

The plant is salt-tolerant and cold-hardy. It prefers the full sun and well-drained soil. It spreads roots by putting out suckers but in coarse soil puts down a taproot. In dunes it is often partly buried in drifting sand. It blooms in mid-May and June. The fruit ripens in August and early September.

The species is endangered in Maine, where it is in serious decline due to commercial development of its beach habitats.

Taxonomy
The species was first described by Marshall in 1785 as Prunus maritima, the "Sea side Plumb". A few sources cite Wangenheim as the author, though Wangenheim's publication dates to 1787, two years later than Marshall's.

A plant with rounded leaves, of which only a single specimen has ever been found in the wild, has been described as P. maritima var. gravesii (Small) G.J.Anderson, though its taxonomic status is questionable, and it may be better considered a cultivar P. maritima'' 'Gravesii'. The original plant, found in Connecticut, died in the wild in about 2000, but it is maintained in cultivation from rooted cuttings.

Distribution and habitat
The species can be found from Maine south to Maryland. Although sometimes listed as extending north to Canada's New Brunswick, the species is not known from collections there and does not appear in the most authoritative works on the flora of that province.

Uses
The species is grown commercially for fruit and value added products like jam. Taste of ripe fruit is prevailingly sweet, though individual bushes range in flavor and some are sour or slightly bitter. About the size of grapes, beach plums are much smaller in size when compared to the longer cultivated Asian varieties found in the supermarket, though are resilient to many North American stone fruit pests, such as black knot fungus. A number of cultivars have been selected for larger and better-flavored fruit, including Resigno, Wild Goose, ECOS, Eastham, Hancock and Squibnocket.

Natali Vineyards in Goshen, New Jersey, produces a wine from beach plums. Greenhook Ginsmiths in Greenpoint, Brooklyn, New York, makes a gin flavored with beach plums.

Culture
Places named after the beach plum include Plum Island, Massachusetts, Plum Island, New York, Plum Cove Beach in Lanesville, Gloucester, Massachusetts, and Beach Plum Island State Park in Sussex County, Delaware.

Fresh and dried, it was used extensively by Native Americans and eventually colonists. It is experiencing a revival in popularity with the resurgence of foraging, the local food movement, and the prominence of native species selection in permaculture design.

Gallery

References

Further reading

External links 

 
 Beach Plum @ Cornell University

maritima
Plants described in 1789
Trees of the Northeastern United States